The Schism of the Russian Church, also known as Raskol (meaning "split" or "schism"), was the splitting of the Russian Orthodox Church into an official church and the Old Believers movement in the mid-17th century. It was triggered by the reforms of Patriarch Nikon in 1653, which aimed to establish uniformity between Greek and Russian church practices.

Church reforms and reaction to them
The members of an influential circle called the Zealots of Piety (Russian: Кружок ревнителей благочестия,  Kruzhok revnitelei blagochestiya) stood for purification of Russian Orthodox faith. They strove to reform Muscovite society, bringing it into closer accordance with Christian values and to improve church practices. As a consequence, they also were engaged in the removal of alternative versions and correction of divine service books. The most influential members of this circle were Archpriests Avvakum, Ivan Neronov, Stephan Vonifatiyev, Fyodor Rtishchev and, when still Archbishop of Novgorod, Nikon himself, the future Patriarch.

With the support from the Russian Tsar Alexei Mikhailovich, Patriarch Nikon began the process of correction of the Russian divine service books in accordance with their modern Greek counterparts and changed some of the rituals (the two-finger sign of the cross was replaced by the one with three fingers, "hallelujah" was to be pronounced three times instead of two etc.). These innovations met with resistance from both the clergy and the people, who disputed the legitimacy and correctness of these reforms, referring to theological traditions and Eastern Orthodox ecclesiastic rules. Ignoring these protests, the reforms were approved by the church sobors in 1654–1655. In 1653–1656, the Print Yard under Epifany Slavinetsky began to produce corrected versions of newly translated divine service books.

A traditional, widespread view of these reforms is that they only affected the external ritualistic side of the Russian Orthodox faith and that these changes were deemed a major event by the religious Russian people. However, these reforms, apart from their arbitrariness, established radically different relations between the church and the faithful. It soon became obvious that Nikon had used this reform for the purpose of centralization of the church and strengthening of his own authority. Nikon's forcible introduction of the new divine service books and rituals caused a major estrangement between the Zealots of Piety and Nikon. Some of its members stood up for the old faith (staroobryadsty : Old Ritualists) and opposed the reforms and patriarch's actions.

Avvakum and Daniel first petitioned to the tsar to officialize the two-finger sign of the cross and bows during divine services and sermons. Then, they tried to prove to the clergy that the correction of the books in accordance with the Greek standards profaned the pure faith because the Greek Church had deviated from the "ancient piety" and had been printing its divine service books in Catholic print houses and that they had been exposed to Roman Catholic influences. Ivan Neronov spoke against the strengthening of patriarch's authority and demanded democratization of ecclesiastic management. This conflict between Nikon and defenders of the old faith took a turn for the worse and soon Avvakum, Ivan Neronov and others would be persecuted and eventually executed in 1682.

The case brought by the defenders of the old faith found many supporters among different strata of the Russian society, which would give birth to the Raskol movement. A part of the old faith low-ranking clergy protested against the increase of feudal oppression, coming from the church leaders. Some members of the high-ranking clergy joined the Raskol movement due to their discontent over Nikon's aspirations and the arbitrariness of his church reforms.

Some of them, such as Bishop Paul of Kolomna, Archbishop Alexander of Vyatka (as well as a number of monasteries, such as the famous Solovetsky Monastery), stood up for the old faith; bishop Paul was eventually executed for his loyalty to the old rites. Boyarynya Feodosiya Morozova, her sister Princess Urusova, and some other courtiers openly supported or secretly sympathized with the defenders of the old faith.

The unification of such heterogeneous forces against what had become "the official church" could probably be explained by the somewhat contradictory ideology of the Raskol movement. A certain idealization and conservation of traditional values and old traditions, a critical attitude towards innovations, conservation of national originality and acceptance (by radical elements) of martyrdom in the name of the old faith as the only way towards salvation were intertwined with criticism of feudalism and serfdom. Different social strata were attracted to different sides of this ideology.

The most radical apologists of the Raskol preached about approaching Armageddon and coming of the Antichrist, Tsar's and patriarch's worshiping of Satan, which ideas would find a broad response among the Russian people, sympathizing with the ideology of these most radical apologetes. The Raskol movement thus became a vanguard of the conservative and at the same time democratic opposition.

Uprisings and persecution 
The Raskol movement gained in strength after the church sobor in 1666–67, which had anathemized the defenders of the old faith (staroobryadsty : Old Ritualists) as heretics and made decisions with regards to their punishment. Especially members of the low-ranking clergy, who had severed their relations with the church, became the leaders of the opposition. Propagation of the split with the church in the name of preservation of the Orthodox faith as it had existed until the reforms was the main postulate of their ideology. The most dramatic manifestations of the Raskol included the practice of the so-called ognenniye kreshcheniya (огненные крещения, or baptism by fire), or self-immolation, practiced by the most radical elements in the Old Believers' movement, who thought that the end of the world was near.

The Old Believers would soon split into different denominations, the Popovtsy and the Bespopovtsy. Attracted to the preachings of the Raskol ideologists, many posad people, mainly peasants, craftsmen and cossacks fled to the dense forests of Northern Russia and Volga region, southern borders of Russia, Siberia, and even abroad, where they would organize their own obshchinas.  This was a mass exodus of common Russian people, who had refused to follow the new ecclesiastic rituals. In 1681, the government noted an increase among the "enemies of the church", especially in Siberia. With active support from the Russian Orthodox Church, it began to persecute the so-called raskolniki (раскольники), i.e., "schism-makers".

In the 1670s–1680s, the exposure of certain social vices in the Russian society gained special importance in the Raskol ideology. Some of the Raskol apologetes, such as Avvakum and his brothers-in-exile at the Pustozyorsk prison, tended to justify some of the uprisings, interpreting them as God's punishment of the ecclesiastic and tsarist authorities for their actions.  Some of the supporters of the Old Believers took part in Stepan Razin's rebellion in 1670–1671, although this uprising is not regarded as an Old Believers' rebellion and Stenka Razin himself had strongly antiecclesiastic views. The supporters of the old faith played an important role in the Moscow uprising of 1682.  Many of the members of the old faith migrated west, seeking refuge in the Polish–Lithuanian Commonwealth, which allowed them to practice their faith freely.

In the late 17th – early 18th century, the most radical elements of the Raskol movement went into recession after it had become obvious that the reforms could not be reversed. The internal policy of Peter the Great eased the persecution of the Old Believers. The Tsar, however, did impose higher taxes on them. During the reign of Catherine the Great, Old Believers who had fled abroad were even encouraged to return to their motherland. However, the position of Old Believers in Russia remained illegal until 1905.

The Raskol (schism) still exists, and with it a certain antagonism between the Russian Orthodox Church of the Moscow Patriarchate and the Old Believers, although on an official level both sides have agreed on a peaceful coexistence.  From an ecclesiastic and theological point of view the Raskol remains a highly controversial question and one of the most tragic episodes of Russian history.

Literary reference 

The term is etymologically related to the family name of Rodion Raskolnikov, the protagonist of Dostoevsky's well-known novel Crime and Punishment.

See also
Patriarch Nikon of Moscow
Old Believers
Edinoverie
Avvakum

References

In English
 .
 .
 .
 .
 .
 .
 
 .

In Russian
 .
 .
 
 .
 .
 .
 .
 .
 .

Old Believer movement
Schisms in Christianity
Schisms from the Eastern Orthodox Church
Religion in Russia
17th-century Eastern Orthodoxy
17th century in Russia

de:Raskolniken
ja:ラスコーリニキ